Alan John Beale (23 July 1923 - 9 December 2005), more commonly known as John Beale, was a leading expert on vaccines and viruses.  While working for Glaxo, he was responsible for starting the industrial scale production of Jonas Salk's vaccine against polio.

History
1958: Headed a team that isolated some of the viruses that cause croup while working in The Hospital for Sick Children, Toronto.

References

English scientists
1923 births
2005 deaths
Vaccinologists
British virologists
Polio
GSK plc people
British expatriates in Canada